Elamaram Kareem (born 1 July 1953) is an Indian politician, trade unionist, and a member of Communist Party of India (Marxist). He is currently a Member of Parliament in Rajya Sabha.

He was the Minister for Industries & Commerce in the Left Democratic Front government under V. S. Achuthanandan from 2006 to 2011. He earlier represented the Beypore constituency in Kozhikode district in the Kerala Legislative Assembly.

Career
Kareem was instrumental in organizing the tile industry as well as its revival activities across Kerala.

From 2 June 2018, he is an MP in Rajya Sabha and a standing committee member on labour. He has 89% attendance and 98% participation in debates as opposed to the national average of 78% and 37.4% respectively. Construction of Nanjakode- Nilamboor railway line, Revival of FACT, Kochi, Against the Privatisation of Hindustan Newsprint Limited, Kerala, demand for Kannur seaport-airport-Wayanad- Coorg-Mysuru rail line, Report of Central team on Kerala floods, Reduction in seats for M.Phil. and PhD in Central Universities are some of the major issues he raised in parliament along with various other labour and agricultural issues.

On 21 September 2020, Kareem along with seven other members were suspended from the Rajya Sabha for their unruly behaviour in the house by tearing documents, breaking mics, standing on tables and heckling the Deputy Chairman of the Rajya Sabha. Their actions were condemned by several leaders.

See also 
 Kerala Council of Ministers

References

External links

Industry Vision

Malayali politicians
People from Kozhikode district
Communist Party of India (Marxist) politicians from Kerala
Living people
1953 births
Kerala MLAs 1996–2001
People from Malappuram district
Politicians from Thiruvananthapuram